Stark Naked and Absolutely Live is the first official live album by German band Alphaville. While the Dreamscapes compilation featured a full CD of live material, its tracks were culled from many different concerts. The tracks on Stark Naked and Absolutely Live were recorded specifically for the purpose of creating the album. The final listed track, Apollo, is followed by a hidden track: an acoustic version of "Dance with Me".

Track listing

Personnel
Marian Gold - lead vocals
Martin Lister - keyboards, backing vocals
Rob Harris - guitar, backing vocals
Shane Meehan - drums, percussion

References

Alphaville (band) albums
2000 live albums